Nehemiah Samuel Libowitz was a Hebrew scholar and author; born January 3, 1862, at Kolno, Łomża.  He studied Talmud under Rabbi Elijah Chasid and then under his own father, Isaac Libowitz; in addition he devoted himself to Hebrew literature, reading especially works on criticism.

In 1881 he emigrated to the United States and settled in New York, where he split his time between business and literature. He died on June 12, 1939.

Publications
Libowitz is the author of:
Iggeret Bikkoret (New York, 1895), against I. H. Weiss;
Rabbi Yehudah Aryeh Modena (Vienna, 1896; 2d ed., New York, 1901), his most important work, a collection of materials for a biography of Leon of Modena;
Ephraim Deinard (ib. 1901), a harsh criticism of Deinard; and several other pamphlets.

Libowitz has also contributed to the Hebrew periodicals in the United States: Ner Ma'arabi, Ha-Modia' lachadashim, and Yalkut Ma'arabi.

References 
 
 Benzion Eisenstadt, Chakme Yisrael be-Amerika, p. 62, New York, 1903

American Orthodox rabbis
Emigrants from the Russian Empire to the United States
Polish Orthodox rabbis
American people of Polish-Jewish descent
Russian people of Polish-Jewish descent
American people of Russian-Jewish descent
1862 births
1939 deaths
20th-century American rabbis
19th-century American rabbis